The Survey of California and Other Indian Languages (originally the Survey of California Indian Languages) at the University of California at Berkeley documents, catalogs, and archives the indigenous languages of the Americas. The survey also hosts events related to language revitalization and preservation.

Origins
The Survey was started as a pilot project by Berkeley linguistics professor Murray Emeneau and Mary Haas in 1953. It was established with an official budget on January 1, 1953. Haas was a particular influence on the early working culture of the Survey. One student, Brent D. Galloway, recalled how several of Haas' students had used a Natchez greeting, wanhetahnú·ʼis, and that "the tradition had apparently continued for over twenty years." (Haas' first publication had been on Natchez.)

The first project was a study of the Karuk language by William Bright, then a graduate student. Since its founding 80 doctoral dissertations have been written under the auspices of the Survey.

Publications

The Survey published a series of "Reports" beginning in 1981, covering a variety of topics related to languages of California as well as Native American languages elsewhere. Some volumes were standalone works such as dictionaries, others were collections of varied articles.  Beginning in 1976 the Survey began publishing the proceedings of Hokan–Penutian Workshop, which addressed the proposed Hokan and Penutian language families. Both resources are available online.

In 2011, a grant from the National Endowment for the Humanities made it possible to merge online resources from the Survey of California and Other Indian Languages and the Berkeley Language Center (BLC) into a single website, the California Language Archive.

Directors
In addition to Haas, the Survey has been directed by Wallace Chafe and Leanne Hinton. The current director is Andrew Garrett.

See also
Classification of indigenous languages of the Americas
Indigenous languages of California
Classification of Native Americans in California
Native American history of California
Traditional narratives (Native California)
Population of Native California

References

External links
 Survey of California and Other Indian Languages

+
Indigenous languages of the North American Southwest
University of California, Berkeley
Extinct languages of North America
Native American language revitalization
Linguistics organizations
Research projects
1953 establishments in California